Tonquédec is a commune in the Côtes-d'Armor department of Brittany in northwestern France.

Population

Inhabitants of Tonquédec are called tonquédois in French.

Breton language
Most of the inhabitants speaking Breton, the municipality launched a Breton linguistic plan through Ya d'ar brezhoneg on May 23, 2006.

See also
Château de Tonquédec
Communes of the Côtes-d'Armor department

Sister City
Corofin, County Clare (Ireland)

References

External links

Communes of Côtes-d'Armor